Alberto Eduardo Madero Lanusse (14 November 1923 – 1 November 2011) was an Argentine rower. He competed at the 1948 Summer Olympics and the 1952 Summer Olympics.

References

External links
 

1923 births
2011 deaths
Argentine male rowers
Olympic rowers of Argentina
Rowers at the 1948 Summer Olympics
Rowers at the 1952 Summer Olympics
Pan American Games medalists in rowing
Pan American Games gold medalists for Argentina
Rowers at the 1951 Pan American Games
Medalists at the 1951 Pan American Games
Rowers from Buenos Aires